Trimethyltin chloride is an organotin compound with the formula . It is a white solid that is highly toxic and malodorous. It is susceptible to hydrolysis.

Synthesis
Trimethyltin chloride can be prepared by the redistribution reaction of tetramethyltin with tin tetrachloride.

This redistribution reaction is typically performed with no solvent because high temperatures are required and purification is simplified.

A second route to  involves treating the corresponding hydroxide or oxide (in the following reaction, trimethyltin hydroxide ) with a halogenating agent such as hydrogen chloride or thionyl chloride:

Uses
Trimethyltin chloride is used as a source of the trimethylstannyl group. For example, it is a precursor to vinyltrimethylstannane and indenyltrimethylstanane  (see Transition metal indenyl complex):

Reduction of trimethyltin chloride with sodium gives hexamethylditin:

References

Chlorides
Metal halides
Organotin compounds
Foul-smelling chemicals
Tin(IV) compounds
Methyl complexes